Chaohua Wang is a freelance essayist and researcher, with a Ph.D. in modern Chinese literature from the University of California, Los Angeles.

Wang is the daughter of a former professor of Chinese literature at Beijing University. In 1989 she was an M.A. student in modern Chinese literature at the Chinese Academy of Social Sciences. She was a member of the standing committee of the Beijing Autonomous Association of College Students in the spring of 1989 during the demonstrations in Tiananmen Square and was put on the Chinese government's "21 Most Wanted Beijing Student Leaders" list. She spent more than six months in hiding before going to the U.S. in early 1990.

See also 
 Women’s Roles during the Tiananmen Square Protests of 1989

References

Notes

Sources
 Wang, Chaohua (Editor and Translator) One China, Many Paths Verso, London, 2005. 

 Wang Ban Review of One China, Many Paths (2006) at MCLC Resource Center, Ohio State University

Year of birth missing (living people)
Living people
University of California, Los Angeles alumni